Samuel Jaudon (1796-1874) was a 19th-century banker and businessman who, as an employee and agent of the Bank of the United States, helped cause or worsen the Panic of 1837.

Early and family life
Jaudon was born in 1796, the eldest son of Daniel and Anna (McNeal) Jaudon. He graduated from Princeton University in 1813.

Marguerite Peyton Alricks (1799-1880) married Jaudon and bore six children, three of whom survived their parents: Francis Orme Jaudon (1825-1827); Julia Webster Jaudon (1831-1901); Samuel Peyton Jaudon (1831-1891, who married Oshidzu Matsura (d. 1896 in Japan); Francis Duncan Jaudon (1833-1906); Lawson White Jaudon (1836-1852); and Ada Mary Jaudon (1839).

A sister-in-law was Mary T. Bainbridge, daughter of Commodore William Bainbridge ( -1835), who bequeathed his daughters Pennsylvania state bonds. Jaudon managed the money, ultimately to ill effect, as described below.

Career
In 1835, Jaudon sold the Bainbridge estate bonds and invested the money in the Delaware and Raritan Canal Company. Jaudon's principal job at the time was cashier of the Bank of the United States under Nicholas Biddle when the bank was still an authorized national bank and the heart of the Bank War between Biddle and U.S. president Andrew Jackson. During these years, the bank was "plagued with allegations of poor management and fraud" including improper investments made by Jaudon and others, and election fraud in the form of preferential loans to political allies. The bank lost its national charter but stayed in business with a state charter.

In 1837-1838, Jaudon served as a director of the Wilmington and Susquehanna Railroad, one of the four companies that created the first rail link from Philadelphia to Baltimore. (The main line survives today as part of Amtrak's Northeast Corridor.) When the W&S merged into the Philadelphia, Wilmington, and Baltimore Railroad, Jaudon stayed on as a director. His service as a railroad executive is noted on the 1839 Newkirk Viaduct Monument in Philadelphia.

Jaudon resigned from the railroad's board in 1838, and traveled to London to try to sell various U.S. securities on behalf of the now-private second Second Bank of the United States|Bank of the United States. Among his endeavors, he sought in March to secure a $400,000 loan for the PW&B-connected Harrisburg, Portsmouth, Mountjoy and Lancaster Railroad. In May, he told railroad officials that the bond market was glutted, but they pressed him to lower his price.

In August, PW&B officials authorized he and William Strickland to negotiate a loan for their railroad. He ultimately succeeded in 1840 in obtaining a loan of $113,000 by using United States Bank bonds as collateral.

Jaudon was noted as a skilled "financial diplomat" who managed to keep European capital flowing to the Bank amid the Panic of 1837, his efforts to abet U.S. cotton speculation, and dubious bond sales, but could not ultimately keep the bank afloat. It suspended payments in late 1839, and closed in 1841.

On December 10, 1841, Jaudon, along with Biddle and John Andrews, were indicted by a grand jury on charges of defrauding the bank's stockholders of $400,000 in 1836 and trying to cover it up through fraudulent recordkeeping in 1841.

By 1844, Jaudon and his family lived in New York City.

In 1855, Jaudon was secretary of the Texas Pacific Railway Company based in New York, but which sought to build a railroad with land grants from the Mississippi River. President Polk's Secretary of the Treasury Robert J. Walker was President, and Samuel Butler King of Georgia was also involved. The American Civil War interrupted the project, which ultimately succeeded after Jaudon's death as the Texas and Pacific Railway under Jay Gould.

In 1865, Jaudon took out a loan from the National City Bank of New York to finance coal speculation, and gave as collateral 47 shares of his sister-in-law's stock without her knowledge, and later the remaining 70 shares. In December 1867, when the loan came due, he sold Mary's stock to cover his own debt. Mary sued Jaudon, who sued his bank, who countersued in a case that was ultimately decided by the Supreme Court. The Jaudons lost the money.

Death
Jaudon died in Philadelphia on May 31, 1874, survived by his widow and three children. He was interred at Mount Vernon Cemetery in Philadelphia.

Notes

1796 births
1874 deaths
American railroad executives
Burials at Mount Vernon Cemetery (Philadelphia)
19th-century American businesspeople
Princeton University alumni